Ice hockey in Spain is governed by the Federación Española de Deportes de Hielo. Competition is divided into division levels, with the highest competition being in the Superliga Española de Hockey Hielo. 

The teams also compete in a domestic cup competition each year, called the Copa del Rey. The winners of the Division de Honor (Honor Division) play the winners of the Copa del Rey in the Supercopa de España de Hockey Hielo (Super Cup).

The Spain national ice hockey team represents the country in international competitions.

Current divisions
 Superliga
 Liga Elite Masculina
 Liga Elite Feminina
 
For a list of teams, see List of ice hockey clubs in Spain

See also
 List of ice hockey clubs in Spain

References

External links
Royal Spanish Winter Sports Federation Official Website
"Hockey in Spain Still Surviving" at NHL.com. Retrieved 11-29-06.